Archduchess Elisabeth Amalie of Austria (7 July 1878 – 13 March 1960) was a daughter of Archduke Karl Ludwig of Austria and his third wife Infanta Maria Theresa of Portugal. She was the mother of Franz Joseph II, Prince of Liechtenstein, and the paternal grandmother of Hans-Adam II, Prince of Liechtenstein.

Family and early life

Elisabeth was born in Reichenau on 7 July 1878. She was born the youngest of a large family, as her father Archduke Karl Ludwig of Austria married three times and had children with two of his wives. With his first wife Princess Margaretha of Saxony, he had no children. With his second wife Princess Maria Annunciata of Bourbon-Two Sicilies, Karl Ludwig fathered  Archduke Franz Ferdinand of Austria, who became heir to the throne of Austria-Hungary, as well as three other siblings. Elisabeth and her older sister Archduchess Maria Annunciata of Austria (later Abbess of the Theresia Convent in the Hradschin, Prague) were the product of his third marriage to Infanta Maria Theresa of Portugal, a daughter of the deposed King Miguel I of Portugal.

In addition, her father was a younger brother of Franz Joseph I of Austria, the reigning emperor at the time of her birth. He was also a sibling of Maximilian I of Mexico, who became Emperor of Mexico for a short period of time.

Marriage

On 20 April 1903, in Vienna, Archduchess Elisabeth Amalie married Prince Aloys of Liechtenstein. There had been some debate as to whether this was an equal union. Emperor Franz Joseph I attended the wedding with the intention of making it clear he regarded the House of Liechtenstein as a legitimate reigning dynasty. As the House of Liechtenstein had become sovereign, the couple were ruled equal in birth, and the Emperor was happy to see a member of his family making a dynastic marriage, after the morganatic marriage of her half-brother Archduke Franz Ferdinand of Austria. Later, the Emperor also became the godfather of the couple's eldest son, Franz Joseph, who was named after him.

Sometime after their marriage, Princess Catherine Radziwill commented that Elisabeth "is very pretty and resembles her mother more than the Habsburgs, whose lower lip she has not inherited by some kind of miracle, for which, I suppose, she feels immeasurably grateful". Elisabeth and Aloys lived in various castles within Austria, including Gross-Ullersdorf Castle. Their eldest son was born in Frauenthal Castle.

The couple had eight children together:

She owned thirty-one motor cars and was seen as the most enthusiastic motorist of all the imperial women in Europe. She converted the stables at her Hungarian castle Stuhlweissenburg to garages but pursued her hobby rather quietly and studiously, so that the great majority of the public were not even aware of her large collection.

Prince Aloys renounced his rights to the succession on 26 February 1923, in favor of their son Franz Joseph, who would accede to the throne on 25 July 1938 as Franz Joseph II. Prince Aloys himself died on 17 March 1955 from influenza at Vaduz Castle in Liechtenstein. Due to his renunciation, he never ruled over the tiny principality. Elisabeth died on 13 March 1960.

Ancestry

See also

Descendants of Miguel I of Portugal

References

Sources

1878 births
1960 deaths
People from Neunkirchen District, Austria
House of Habsburg
Austrian princesses
House of Liechtenstein
Liechtenstein princesses
20th-century Liechtenstein women
19th-century Liechtenstein women
20th-century Liechtenstein people
19th-century Liechtenstein people
19th-century Austrian people
19th-century Austrian women